RC Competições / Team RC, currently competing as Eurofarma RC, is a Brazilian auto racing team based in Curitiba, Paraná. RC Competições has won the driver's championship of Stock Car Brasil Championship 9 times, with the most recent being achieved in 2020 by Ricardo Maurício

RC Competições is the most successful team in Stock Car Brasil, being champion 9 times: in 2004 with Giuliano Losacco, 2006 and 2007 with Cacá Bueno, 2010 with Max Wilson, 2013 and 2020 with Ricardo Maurício and 2017, 2018 and 2019 with Daniel Serra.

The team has 7 victories in the Corrida do Milhão, one of the most important races in the championship. It currently has Ricardo Mauricio and Daniel Serra as drivers, both from São Paulo, using the Chevrolet Cruze model. Drivers such as Luciano Burti, Antonio Jorge Neto, the vice-champion in 2006, Enrique Bernoldi, Raul Boesel, Lucas Di Grassi, Nonô Figueiredo, Thiago Camilo, among many others, passed through the team.

References

External links
  

Stock Car Brasil teams
Auto racing teams established in 2000
Brazilian auto racing teams